Alverthorpe  railway station served the village of Alverthorpe near Wakefield in the English county of West Yorkshire.

History

Opened by the Bradford, Wakefield and Leeds Railway, the station had two platforms. It became part of the London and North Eastern Railway during the Grouping of 1923. The line then passed on to the Eastern Region of British Railways on nationalisation in 1948, closing a mere six years later.

The site today
The station was situated on an embankment northeast of Batley Road, after the railway crossed over the road on a bridge near the junction with Grasmere Road. The location is marked by a row of terraced houses. Nothing now remains on site, and the two sides of the  triangular junction northeast of the station that connected it with the line between Wakefield and Leeds have been dismantled. Trains still use the eastern part of the triangle, bypassing the site between Outwood and Wakefield Westgate stations on the Wakefield Line.

References

 
 
 Station on navigable O.S. map

Disused railway stations in Wakefield
Former Great Northern Railway stations
Railway stations in Great Britain opened in 1872
Railway stations in Great Britain closed in 1954